The Ukrainian T-shaped Radio telescope, second modification (official abbreviation UTR-2) is the world's largest low-frequency radio telescope at decametre wavelengths. It was completed in 1972 near the village of Hrakovo, 15 km west-south-west from Shevchenkove, Ukraine. The telescope is operated by the Institute of Radio Astronomy of the Ukrainian Academy of Sciences.

The UTR-2 consists of an array of 2040 dipole elements in two arms each containing 6 rows of elements, oriented in a T shape: a north–south arm consisting of 1440 elements covering an area of 1800×60 meters, and an east–west arm consisting of 600 elements covering an area of 900×60 meters. The basic element is a broadband cage dipole 1.8 m in diameter and 8 m long made of galvanized steel wire, mounted 3.5 m above the ground, with a balun to connect it to the transmission line. The dipoles are all oriented along the east–west axis, with the spacing between rows of 7.5 m in east–west direction and 9 m in north–south. The operating frequency range is 8–33 MHz. The sensitivity is about 10 mJy.

Steering of the antenna main lobe is accomplished with phase shifters consisting of switchable delay lines.

The telescope is a part of the URAN (Ukrainian Radio Interferometer of NASU) decametric VLBI system, which includes another four significantly smaller low-frequency radio telescopes. That system has bases from 40 to 900 km (25 to 960 mi).

The telescope was seriously damaged during 2022 Russian invasion of Ukraine, the observatory's measuring complex and scientific equipment (but not the antennas) were completely destroyed.

See also
 List of radio telescopes

References

External links
 Institute of Radio Astronomy of the National Academy of Sciences of Ukraine 
 Braude, S. Ia.; Megn, A. V.; Riabov, B. P.; Sharykin, N. K.; Zhuk, I. N., Decametric survey of discrete sources in the Northern sky. I - The UTR-2 radio telescope: Experimental techniques and data processing, Astrophys. and Space Sci., 54, 3–36, 1978
 URAN-3 radio interferometer antenna field (abandoned)
 A. Konovalenko, L. Sodin, V. Zakharenko, P. Zarka, O. Ulyanov, M. Sidorchuk, S. Stepkin, P. Tokarsky et al. The modern radio astronomy network in Ukraine: UTR-2, URAN and GURT, Experimental Astronomy, Vol. 42, Is. 1, pp 11–48.

Radio telescopes
Interferometric telescopes
Astronomical observatories built in the Soviet Union